Jean De Busschere (16 February 1900 – 16 January 1987) was a Belgian racing cyclist. He rode in the 1926 Tour de France.

References

1900 births
1987 deaths
Belgian male cyclists
Place of birth missing